Punjab State Highway 13, commonly referred to as SH 13, is a state highway in the state of Punjab in India. This state highway runs through Ludhiana district and Barnala district from Mullanpur Dakha to Barnala in the state of Punjab. The total length of the highway is 57 kilometres.

Route description
The route of the highway is Mullanpur Dakha-Bhora Sahib-Halwara-Raikot-Mehal Kalan-Barnala.

Major junctions

  National Highway 5 in Mullanpur Dakha
 Major District Road 53 (MDR 53) in Raikot
  National Highway 703 in Barnala

See also
 List of state highways in Punjab, India

References 

State Highways in Punjab, India